John Humphrey may refer to:
 John Humphrey (Massachusetts colonist) (1597–1661), financial backer and settler of colonial Massachusetts
 John Humphrey (Illinois politician) (1838–1914), Illinois Representative and State Senator
 John Humphrey (bass player), bass player with Scott Henderson and Kirk Covington
 John Humphrey (drummer) (born 1970), percussionist
 John Humphrey (cricketer) (1837–?), English cricketer
 John Humphrey (footballer) (born 1961), English footballer
 John Peters Humphrey (1905–1995), Canadian legal scholar, jurist, and human rights advocate
 John A. Humphrey (1823–?), mill owner and political figure in New Brunswick, Canada
 John H. Humphrey (1915–1987), British bacteriologist and immunologist
 John Humphrey House (disambiguation)
 John Humphrey, architect, designed Tabernacle Chapel, Morriston
 Jack Humphrey (1901–1967), painter
 Jack Humphrey (producer) (1932–1987), Canadian television producer and writer

See also
 John Humphreys (disambiguation)